Hotels Monastir is a railway station on the outskirts of Monastir, Tunisia.

Trains from the station run on the electrified, metre-gauge Sahel Metro line and serve Sousse to the north.

The station lies between the Sahline Sebkha to the west and Skanes-Monastir airport station to the east.

References 

Railway stations in Tunisia